Berta Maria Correia de Almeida de Melo Cabral (born Ponta Delgada) is an Azorean politician.

An economist by profession, Cabral received her degree in finance from the Lisbon School of Economics and Management at the Technical University of Lisbon in 1975. She served as regional director of treasury and transportation and communications for a time in the 1980s before being named to the government of Mota Amaral as regional secretary of Finance and Public Administration. Other public roles in the Azores which she has held include administrator of Eléctrica Açoriana, chair of the board of directors of SATA Air Açores, and a member of the Legislative Assembly of the Azores. In 2001 she became leader of the city council of Ponta Delgada, in the process becoming the city's first female mayor. In 2008 she was elected leader of the Azorean branch of the Social Democratic Party with 98.5% of the vote, having run unopposed in the election. She thus became the first woman to lead a political party in the archipelago. In 2012 she was nominated to lead the Ministry of National Defense in the cabinet of Pedro Passos Coelho, becoming the first woman to hold the post in the Portuguese cabinet. Since 2015 she has been a member of the Assembly of the Republic.

References

Living people
Members of the Legislative Assembly of the Azores
Women mayors of places in Portugal
Women government ministers of Portugal
Ministers of National Defence of Portugal
Members of the Assembly of the Republic (Portugal)
20th-century Portuguese economists
Portuguese women economists
People from Ponta Delgada
Technical University of Lisbon alumni
Social Democratic Party (Portugal) politicians
20th-century Portuguese women politicians
20th-century Portuguese politicians
21st-century Portuguese women politicians
21st-century Portuguese politicians
Azorean women in politics
Women members of the Assembly of the Republic (Portugal)
Year of birth missing (living people)